is a Japanese voice actress.

Filmography

Anime
1999
Poppu Harukaze in Ojamajo Doremi (Magical Doremi)
Takako Takakura in Magic User's Club

2000
Paiway Underberg in Vandread
Chiyo in InuYasha
Satoko Takanashi in Gate Keepers

2001
Norma in Little Snow Fairy Sugar

2002
Sinobu Amou in The King of Fighters EX2: Howling Blood
Izumi Orimoto (Zoe Orimoto) in Digimon Frontier

2003
Sho-gun in Stratos 4

2005
Haruna Saotome in Negima
Loco in MÄR
Tomoko Egawa in Gokujou Seitokai
Yuuna Kashiwagi and Yuuma Kashiwagi in Pani Poni Dash!
Minami Shibuya in Hell Girl
Meryl Tyler in SoltyRei

2006
Yumiko in Gunbuster (DVD appendix part)

2008
Benika Jūzawa in Kure-nai
Kosuzu Sakurazaki / Tanpopo in Sumeba Miyako no Cosmos-Sou
Ikue Ogawa in High School Girls
Madoka in Otomedius
Gelato in Hamtaro
Mari in Dream C Club

Drama CD
2003
Izumi Orimoto (Zoe Orimoto) in Digimon Frontier Original Story: Things That Want To Be Told

2019
Izumi Orimoto (Zoe Orimoto) in Digimon Frontier 2019: A Train Named Hope

Videogames
2021
Tinkermon, Kazemon, Zephyrmon & JetSilphymon in Digimon New Century

References

External links
 
 Ishige Sawa de Gozaimasu The official website for Sawa Ishige.

1979 births
Living people
Voice actresses from Chiba Prefecture
Japanese voice actresses